Jonathon Ephriam Graham (born 18 June 1956) is a former long-distance runner from Scotland, who won the inaugural Rotterdam Marathon on 23 May 1981 in a time of 2:09:28. He twice finished in fourth place in the men's marathon at the Commonwealth Games (1982 and 1986).

Achievements

References

External links
Biography at JF Pacemakers
Biography
gbrathletics

1956 births
Living people
Scottish male marathon runners
Commonwealth Games competitors for Scotland
Athletes (track and field) at the 1982 Commonwealth Games
Athletes (track and field) at the 1986 Commonwealth Games
Place of birth missing (living people)
Sportspeople from Glasgow